The 1997 Infiniti Open was a men's tennis tournament played on hardcourt in Los Angeles, United States that was part of the World Series of the 1997 ATP Tour. It was the seventieth edition of the tournament and was held from 21 – 27 July 1997.

Marius Barnard and Piet Norval were the defending champions, but none competed this year. Norval opted to rest in order to compete at Montreal the following week.

Sébastien Lareau and Alex O'Brien won the title by defeating Mahesh Bhupathi and Rick Leach 7–6, 6–4 in the final.

Seeds

Draw

Draw

References

External links
 Official results archive (ATP)
 Official results archive (ITF)

Doubles
Los Angeles Open (tennis)